Pierre Arnaudin (13 June 1896 – 14 December 1982) was a French hurdler. He competed in the 400 metres hurdles at the 1924 Summer Olympics and the 1928 Summer Olympics.

References

External links
 

1896 births
1982 deaths
Athletes (track and field) at the 1924 Summer Olympics
Athletes (track and field) at the 1928 Summer Olympics
French male hurdlers
Olympic athletes of France
Place of birth missing